The Plum Borough School District is a midsized, suburban public school district serving the Pittsburgh, Pennsylvania suburb of Plum. According to 2000 federal census data, it served a resident population of 26,940. By 2010, the district's population rose to 27,131 people. In 2009, the district residents' per capita income was $20,863, while the median family income was $52,807. In the Commonwealth, the median family income was $49,501  and the United States median family income was $49,445, in 2010. By 2013, the median household income in the United States rose to $52,100.

Plum Borough School District operates five schools, including Plum Senior High School (9th–12th), Plum Middle School (7th–8th),
One elementary school serving grades (5–6th) Holiday Park Elementary School and two elementary schools serving grades (K-4th): O'Block Elementary School and George Pivik Elementary School.

The Plum Borough School District is bordered by seven other school districts: Penn Hills School District, Gateway School District, Riverview School District, and Allegheny Valley School District (across the Allegheny River). The District is also bordered by three school districts in neighboring Westmoreland County: Franklin Regional School District, Burrell School District and New Kensington-Arnold School District.

Extracurriculars
The students have access to a variety of clubs, activities and sports. Plum Borough School District's football classification is "AAAA" (Quad-A), which is the largest of the football classifications A, AA, AAA and AAAA. The district operates a chapter of the National Honor Society.

Athletics
The District is part of the WPIAL sports organization.

Cheerleading	
Cross Country	(CoEd)
Football	(7-12)
Soccer (Boys and Girls)
Tennis	
Volleyball
Basketball Varsity (Boys and Girls) and 9th grade teams
Rifle (CoEd)
Swimming and Diving (Boys and Girls)
Wrestling
Volleyball varsity and 9th grade teams
Baseball varsity and 9th grade teams
Softball
Tennis
Track and Field (Boys and Girls)

Club sports: Indoor track, Ice Hockey, Bowling and Crew

References

External links 
 

School districts in Allegheny County, Pennsylvania
Education in Pittsburgh area
School districts established in 1940